Fibrinogen beta chain, also known as FGB, is a gene found in humans and most other vertebrates with a similar system of blood coagulation.

The protein encoded by this gene is the beta component of fibrinogen, a blood-borne glycoprotein composed of three pairs of nonidentical polypeptide chains. Following vascular injury, fibrinogen is cleaved by thrombin to form fibrin which is the most abundant component of blood clots. In addition, various cleavage products of fibrinogen and fibrin regulate cell adhesion and spreading, display vasoconstrictor and chemotactic activities, and are mitogens for several cell types. Mutations in this gene lead to several disorders, including afibrinogenemia, dysfibrinogenemia, hypodysfibrinogenemia and thrombotic tendency.

Interactions
Fibrinogen beta chain has been shown to interact with Lipoprotein(a).

See also
 Fibrin
Fibrinogen alpha chain
Fibrinogen gamma chain

References

Further reading